"Eldorado" is the title track from the 1974 album of the same name by the Electric Light Orchestra (ELO).

The song was used as the B-side of the United States single "Boy Blue" in 1975 and later as the flip side to the UK hit single "Wild West Hero" in 1978.

Content 
In the 2001 remastered album's liner notes, composer Jeff Lynne said, "This song is where the dreamer wakes up to reality, then decides he likes his dream world better and tries to get back to Eldorado."

Controversy 
The song gained notoriety when it was claimed by some Christian fundamentalists that "Eldorado" contained some "satanic messages" when the record was played in reverse. Lyrics were claimed to sound like "He is the nasty one - Christ you're infernal" when played backwards. Lynne denied these allegations, and inserted an obviously and deliberately backmasked segment into ELO's next album (Face the Music), within the opening portions of the famous "Fire On High" track.  He later recorded Secret Messages, an entire album strewn with backmasking.

Fleming & John version 

The song was covered by Fleming & John on the tribute album  Lynne Me Your Ears.

References

Electric Light Orchestra songs
Songs written by Jeff Lynne
Song recordings produced by Jeff Lynne
1974 songs
Obscenity controversies in music